Santaluz is a municipality in the Brazilian state of Bahia. Its estimated population in 2020 is 37,531.

References

Municipalities in Bahia